The El Paso Kid is a 1946 American Western film directed by Thomas Carr and written by Norman Sheldon. The film stars Sunset Carson, Marie Harmon, Hank Patterson, Edmund Cobb, Robert Filmer and Wheaton Chambers. The film was released on May 22, 1946, by Republic Pictures.

Plot

Cast  
Sunset Carson as Sunset Carson aka El Paso Kid
Marie Harmon as Sally Stoner
Hank Patterson as Jeff Winters
Edmund Cobb as Sheriff Frank Stoner
Robert Filmer as Gil Santos
Wheaton Chambers as Doctor Hamlin
Zon Murray as Henchman Moyer
Tex Terry as Henchman Kramer
Ed Cassidy as Well Fargo Agent Blake
Johnny Carpenter as Express Guard 
Post Park as Stage Driver
Charles Sullivan as Ed Lowry

References

External links 
 

1946 films
1940s English-language films
American Western (genre) films
1946 Western (genre) films
Republic Pictures films
Films directed by Thomas Carr
American black-and-white films
1940s American films